Euryxaenapta rondoni is a species of beetle in the family Cerambycidae, and the only species in the genus Euryxaenapta. It was described by Breuning in 1963.

References

Acanthocinini
Beetles described in 1963
Monotypic Cerambycidae genera
Taxa named by Stephan von Breuning (entomologist)